The women's +67 kg  competition in taekwondo at the 2000 Summer Olympics in Sydney took place on September 30 at the State Sports Centre.

Chinese taekwondo jin Chen Zhong steadily piled up points to edge 29-year-old Russian veteran Natalia Ivanova 8–3 for the gold medal in the women's heavyweight class. Meanwhile, lone Canadian fighter Dominique Bosshart mounted a six-point onslaught in the third round to kick out and overwhelm 1999 European Champion Nataša Vezmar of Croatia for the bronze medal, delivering a marvelous 11–8 record.

Competition format
The main bracket consisted of a single elimination tournament, culminating in the gold medal match. The taekwondo fighters eliminated in earlier rounds by the two finalists of the main bracket advanced directly to the repechage tournament. These matches determined the bronze medal winner for the event.

Schedule
All times are Greece Standard Time (UTC+2)

Competitors

Results
Legend
PTG — Won by points gap
SUP — Won by superiority
OT — Won on over time (Golden Point)
WO — Walkover

Main bracket

Repechage

References

External links
Official Report

Women's 67 kg
Olymp
Women's events at the 2000 Summer Olympics